Mule Town is an unincorporated community in southwestern Madison Township, Scioto County, Ohio, United States.  Located at the intersection of State Route 335, Lucasville-Minford Road and Bennett Road, it lies just north of the unincorporated community of Minford, 7 miles (11½ km) east of the census-designated place of Lucasville, and 14 miles (23 km) northeast of the city of Portsmouth, the county seat of Scioto County.  Sweet Run, a tributary of the Rocky Fork of the Little Scioto River, flows past the community. Six businesses lie within Mule Town; Mule Town Mini-Mart, AJ's Garage, Bennet's Collision and Repair, Muletown Tires, Muletown Mini storage and the Minford Retirement Center.

References

Unincorporated communities in Scioto County, Ohio
Unincorporated communities in Ohio